Sewickley Heights is a borough in Allegheny County, Pennsylvania, United States. The population was 857 at the 2020 census. Sewickley Heights is one of the wealthiest municipalities in Pennsylvania and in the United States.

History 
Sewickley Heights was established as a borough in 1935, but the area's character was largely established with the move of the Allegheny Country Club from Pittsburgh to its Sewickley Heights location in 1902.  The establishment of the country club accelerated the settlement of the area as a haven for wealthy Pittsburgh residents.  Many estates established in Sewickley Heights up through the 1930s occupied hundreds of acres with houses of immense proportions.  Among the grandest estates was As You Like It, the estate of banker, shipper and investor William Thaw.  As You Like It was featured in a 1903 print advertisement of the United States Battery Company that promoted electric lighting for country homes.  Other notable estates included the Henry Robinson Rea mansion, Farmhill (which hosted Madame Curie in May 1921), and B.F. Jones' 100-room mansion, Fairacres.

Many of the grand estates in Sewickley Heights began to fall into disrepair in the 1950s and 1960s. Many of the original massive houses were demolished and the lots subdivided. Many "neighborhoods" of Sewickley Heights are named after the original estate and the clusters of homes on the estate parcel are marked by unique stone fences original to the old estate.

In the 1960s and 1970s, several parcels of land were donated or purchased to form the Sewickley Heights Borough Park. Sewickley Heights is also home to the Fern Hollow Nature Center and the Sewickley Heights History Center, which are co-located on a  site.

Geography 
Sewickley Heights is located at  (40.561091, -80.155541).

Surrounding neighborhoods 
Sewickley Heights borders five areas, including Bell Acres to the north and northwest, Sewickley Hills to the east and northeast, Aleppo Township to the south, Sewickley to the southwest, and Edgeworth to the west.

Education 
Sewickley Heights is one of 11 communities served by the Quaker Valley School District.

Government and politics 

Sewickley Heights is a reliably Republican jurisdiction in presidential elections. In every presidential election since 1932 (with the possible exception of 1992), the GOP has carried the borough. From 1944-1988, every Republican nominee for president exceeded 70% of the vote in the borough, with nine of their 12 campaigns breaking 80% of the vote, in spite of only Richard Nixon in 1972, and Dwight Eisenhower in 1956 actually winning Allegheny County, and multiple candidates in that span losing Pennsylvania.

The best showing for a Republican is the 89.72% of the vote carried by Thomas Dewey in 1948.

The borough has trended Democratic in the 21st century however. Donald Trump carried the borough twice, but by less than 20 points both times, with the best showing by a Democrat for president being the 45.47% of the vote won by Joe Biden in 2020.

Note that in the 1912 election, in addition to the totals listed for the Bull Moose party, GOP, and Democratic parties, the Socialist nominee Eugene V. Debs received eight votes, and the Prohibition nominee Eugene Chafin received five votes.

Sewickley Heights also supported the Republican in at least 15 of the last 17 gubernatorial elections, including Raymond Broderick in 1970, Scott Wagner in 2018, and Barbara Hafer in 1990 in spite of Broderick losing Allegheny county by 24 points, Wagner by 36 points, and Hafer by a margin of nearly 44 points. Hafer of whom also lost her gubernatorial election statewide by a margin of nearly 34 points.

Councilmembers
 [2017 - 2019] Republicans - 3 (Handley, Kinney, Pangburn), Democrats - 0, Unknowns - 4 (Means, McCargo, Snyder, Sirianni)

Demographics 

As of the census of 2000, 981 people, 336 households, and 273 families resided in the borough. The population density was 133.9 people per square mile (51.7/km2). The 355 housing units averaged 48.5 per square mile (18.7/km2). The racial makeup of the borough was 97.35% White, 0.92% African American, 0.61% Asian, 0.20% from other races, and 0.92% from two or more races. Hispanics or Latinos of any race were 0.31% of the population.

Of the 336 households, 29.5% had children under the age of 18 living with them, 75.0% were married couples living together, 4.8% had a female householder with no husband present, and 18.5% were not families. About 16.1% of all households were made up of individuals, and 6.8% had someone living alone who was 65 years of age or older. The average household size was 2.56, and the average family size was 2.87.

In the borough, the population was distributed as 20.6% under the age of 18, 3.5% from 18 to 24, 17.8% from 25 to 44, 30.1% from 45 to 64, and 28.0% who were 65 years of age or older. The median age was 50 years. For every 100 females, there were 74.6 males. For every 100 females age 18 and over, there were 74.3 males.

The median income for a household in the borough was $115,672, and for a family was $158,756. Males had a median income of $89,473 versus $40,417 for females. The per capita income for the borough was $79,541 placing it at number 99 on the list of highest-income places in the United States. About 5.2% of families and 7.0% of the population were below the poverty line, including 10.0% of those under age 18 and 3.7% of those age 65 or over.

References 

Populated places established in 1935
Boroughs in Allegheny County, Pennsylvania